Downsview Nominees Ltd v First City Corp Ltd [1992] UKPC 34 is a New Zealand insolvency law case decided by the Judicial Committee of the Privy Council concerning the nature and extent of the liability of a mortgagee, or a receiver and manager, to a mortgagor or a subsequent debenture holder for his actions.

Facts

Glen Eden Motors Ltd was a New Zealand company with Fiat and Mazda car selling franchises. It gave a first debenture, securing $230,000 to Westpac, having priority over a second debenture issued to First City Corporation Ltd ("FCC"). Both loans were secured by a floating charge over all assets, and each contained the power to appoint a receiver and manager (i.e., an  administrative receiver), who would be deemed to be an agent of the company, authorized to do any acts which the company could perform.

Glen Eden defaulted on the debenture with FCC, and the latter appointed receivers. The receivers thought the business was unprofitable and should be closed down, and removed the manager of Glen Eden. The ousted manager consulted Russell on the matter. As a result, Downsview Nominees Ltd (controlled by Russell) was assigned Westpac's first debenture, and Russell became the receiver and manager under it. The ousted manager was reinstated, and First City's receivers were relegated to a residual role.

Fearing a poor outcome, First City then offered Downsview Nominees all moneys owing under the first debenture (so it would be redeemed and First City could take charge), or alternatively to sell its second debenture to Downsview on similar terms, but this offer was declined. Glen Eden issued a third debenture to Downsview and Russell carried on the business, losing a further $500,000. First City claimed that Russell (as receiver) and Downsview Nominees (as prior debenture holder) had violated their duties to First City to:

 exercise their powers for proper purposes
 act honest and in good faith
 exercise reasonable care, skill and diligence
 discharge the Westpac debenture as soon as they were in a position to do so
 transfer any surplus assets for First City after such satisfaction of that debenture.

The courts below

After an initial order in January 1988 to transfer the Westpac debenture on terms (which Russell contested and sought to avoid), in August 1989, the High Court of New Zealand held that Russell and Downsview acted for their own purposes, and not for proper purposes, in the matter and were thus liable in negligence to First City. Russell was also prohibited from acting as a director, promoter or manager of any company for five years, under s. 189 of the Companies Act of New Zealand.

On appeal, the Court of Appeal of New Zealand quashed the High Court's order insofar as it related to Downsview and First City Finance (to which First City had assigned the second debenture), and also quashed the disqualification order against Russell, as the court did not have such jurisdiction under the Act.

On application to the Privy Council, Russell appealed the Court of Appeal's order against him, and First City cross-appealed against Russell and Downsview to have the High Court orders reinstated.

Judgment

The Privy Council ruled that the High Court's order against Russell and Downsview should be restored, but upheld the quashing of the disqualification order against Russell.

In his ruling, Lord Templeman held that:

 Russell had been in breach of duty because he had not used his powers for a proper purpose, meeting the Managing Director's wishes.
 Downsview should have accepted First City's offer to redeem the debenture, and so First City should be compensated.
 This was not a negligence action. A general duty of care was not owed because this was "inconsistent with the right of the mortgagee and the duties which the courts applying equitable principles have imposed on the mortgagee." Yet the duty to act in good faith and for proper purposes was owed in equity:

See also

UK insolvency law

Notes

References
L Sealy and S Worthington, Cases and Materials in Company Law (9th edn OUP 2010)
R Goode, Principles of Corporate Insolvency Law (4th edn Sweet & Maxwell 2011)

United Kingdom insolvency case law
Judicial Committee of the Privy Council cases on appeal from New Zealand
New Zealand tort case law
1992 in New Zealand law
1992 in case law